Hundred of Ongar was an ancient hundred in the west of the county of Essex, England.  Hundred of Ongar was centred on the town of Chipping Ongar.

Hundred of Ongar contained the following parishes: 

Abbess Roding
Beauchamp Roding
Berners Roding
Bobbingworth or Bovinger
Chigwell
Chipping Ongar
 Fyfield
Greensted-juxta-Ongar
High Laver
High Ongar
Kelvedon Hatch
Lambourne
Little Laver
Loughton
Magdalen Laver
 Moreton
Navestock
North Weald Bassett
Norton Mandeville
 Shelley
Stanford Rivers
Stapleford Abbotts
Stapleford Tawney
Stondon Massey
Theydon Bois
Theydon Garnon
Theydon Mount

See also
Hundreds of Essex

References

External links
The Hundred of Ongar

Hundreds of Essex